Philip Napier Miles JP DLitt h.c. (Bristol) (21 January 1865 – 19 July 1935) was a prominent and wealthy citizen of Bristol, UK, who left his mark on the city, especially on what are now its western suburbs, through his musical and organisational abilities and through good works of various kinds. He was the only son of Philip William Skynner Miles (1816–1881), a major promoter and developer of the docks at Avonmouth, who was the eldest son of Philip John Miles (1773–1845) by his second marriage to Clarissa Peach (1790–1868), and Pamela Adelaide Napier, daughter of the soldier (distinguished in the Peninsular War) and military historian General Sir William Francis Patrick Napier. He was therefore half-nephew of Sir William Miles, 1st Baronet, half-cousin of Sir Philip John William Miles, 2nd Baronet, both Conservative politicians, and cousin of the fashionable portrait painter Frank Miles, gentleman cricketer Robert Miles and Mount Everest explorer, General The Hon Charles Granville Bruce. He was educated at Harrow School and Oriel College, Oxford, and was selected as High Sheriff of Gloucestershire for 1916–17.

Life in music 
Philip Napier Miles was the last squire of Kingsweston and was prominent in an amateur capacity in the musical life of the city in the early part of the 20th century, having studied in post-Wagnerian Dresden and under Hubert Parry.  He was a minor composer gaining modest recognition for his small output.  He wrote six operas, three of which remain unperformed and four unpublished.  His other works are a sonata for violin and piano, a Fantasia on two Elizabethan themes (by Thomas Weelkes and Thomas Morley), and two early works: a first and only symphony (in C) and the "Lyric overture: From the West Country".  His other vocal works consist of songs with piano accompaniment, mostly published, and the school song for the then Portway Senior Boys' School in nearby Shirehampton.  Although Kingsweston was known as a welcoming place for musicians and a centre for music, Miles did not court fame as a composer.  His works occasionally had performances in his lifetime in London and at the Hereford for the Three Choirs Festival, and at least one broadcast (of the "Lyric overture").  No recordings of his music are known.

Miles was a friend and supporter of Ralph Vaughan Williams, whose violin rhapsody "The Lark Ascending" was first performed by Marie Hall (with piano accompaniment) in 1920 at Shirehampton Public Hall at his instigation.  He also founded the Avonmouth Choral Society and was president of the Bristol Madrigal Society (1910–1914).  He organised operatic seasons at Shirehampton, later the Victoria Rooms, Clifton, and, in 1926 the Theatre Royal, Bristol, and some of his own operas were staged at these venues.  His wish had been to establish an English national opera-house, but it was not to be fulfilled. At Shirehampton, he was openly trying to emulate Rutland Boughton's "village opera" at Glastonbury.  For these services to music, he was awarded an honorary doctorate of letters by the University of Bristol in 1925.

Miles's papers are currently deposited with the University of Bristol Library.  They include autograph scores, printed works, and correspondence (e.g. with Falla), as well as signed copies of works by Holst, Vaughan Williams, Grainger and John Stainer.  It is uncertain whether any of his music has been publicly performed since the commemorative concert at the University of Bristol on 7 May 1935.

Philanthropy 
As well as his artistic achievements, Miles's great philanthropy towards the area around Kingsweston include donations of land for the Shirehampton Public Hall in 1903, which is now a grade II listed building, and to the National Trust in 1918, as well as for various local schools, churches, and sporting activities including cricket and golf. In 1930 he gave land at Sea Mills for homes for World War I veterans, and established covenants which were intended to ensure that only relatively low-density housing was built on it, in line with the ideals of the garden city movement of the time. His philanthropy might be thought of as aesthetic and moral (tending to improve the condition of working people through the provision of space, sport, education and religion); as might be expected from his family links, he was a social and political conservative, a fact reflected in the names of streets developed on the Kingsweston estate, some of which commemorate Conservative politicians of international and local importance.

End of the Kingsweston estate 
Through his marriage, he was brother-in-law of Colonel Robert Charles Goff and George Percy Jacomb-Hood. Even after giving so much in philanthropic acts during his life, the Grant of Probate for his Will shows that he still had personal estate worth £286,422 11s 4d (£87,561,390 in 2008 terms). His estate was dealt with by his executors who included his cousin, William StJohn Fenton Miles, a Director of the National Provincial Bank which, by now, had taken over the family's original bank, Miles & Co.   His ashes are buried at Henbury parish church, and his grave is marked by the punning family motto "Labora siccut bonus miles": 'Work like a good soldier.' He is commemorated in the name of Napier Miles Road, leading to the gate of Kingsweston (Kings Weston House).

List of Miles's operas 
 Queen Rosamond
 Westward Ho! (1913; performed at the Lyceum, London)
 Fireflies (performed Bristol 1924)
 Markheim (1919; Carnegie award 1921; performed Bristol 1924; vocal score published by J. Curwen, 1926)
 Good Friday (vocal score published by Oxford University Press, 1933)
 Demeter

List of Miles's other published works 
 Four Songs, poetry by Shelley. C. Jefferys, 1891.
 Hymn before Sunrise for Baritone Solo, Chorus and Orchestra, the words by S. T. Coleridge ... the pianoforte accompaniment arranged ... by S. P. Waddington. Boosey & Co, 1896.
 Fragment of an Ode to Maia. [Four-part song.] Words by Keats. Op. 5. No. 6, etc. Stainer & Bell, 1911.
 Nocturn. [Four-part song.] Words by E. F. Benson. Op. 5. No. 5, etc. Stainer & Bell, 1913.
 Rose cheek'd Laura. [Four-part song.] Words by T. Campion. Op. 5. No. 4. Stainer & Bell, 1916.
 Battle. [Song cycle.] Ten Songs, poems by W. W. Gibson. Op. 7. S. Acott & Co, 1917.
 Music comes. Choral Dance for tenor solo, female chorus and small orchestra, the poem by J. Freeman. Op. 11. [Vocal score.]. Boosey & Co, 1921.
 Battle .... Second Set. Op. 9. Poems by W. W. Gibson, etc. J. Curwen & Sons, 1929.
 Ode on a Grecian Urn. Poem by J. Keats ... For Chorus and Orchestra. Vocal Score. [Pianoforte version by Archibald Jacob.] Oxford University Press, 1931 [chorus version 1934].
 In the Belfry. [Mixed voices.] Poem by A. Dobson. Op. 20. No. 1 (The Oxford Choral Songs). Oxford University Press, 1932.
 Four Songs for Baritone Voice & Oboe. The words by Robert Bridges. (1. The Poppy. 2. The Cliff-top. 3. Thou art alone, fond Lover. 4. When June is come.) Oxford University Press, 1933.
 My Master hath a Garden. [Song.] The poem from "Corn from olde Fields," etc. Oxford University Press, 1933.

References

Online

General sources

External links 
Philip Napier Miles papers, 1884–1951 University of Bristol Library Special Collections
Philip Napier Miles's conducting baton – University of Bristol Cabinet of Curiosities

English classical composers
1865 births
1935 deaths
People educated at Harrow School
Alumni of Oriel College, Oxford
English opera composers
Male opera composers
English philanthropists
Musicians from Bristol
High Sheriffs of Gloucestershire
Musicians from Gloucestershire
English male classical composers
People from Shirehampton